Portør is a village and port on the south coast line of Kragerø in Telemark, Norway. The inlet Stølefjorden extends to the north of Portør. Until the mid-1960s,  Portør harbor used to have a pilot and custom station. Norwegian County Road 254 runs from  Portør to the village of Levang where it meets  Norwegian National Road 351.

References

Villages in Vestfold og Telemark
Kragerø